The 2012 Superstars Series Imola round was the second round of the 2012 Superstars Series season. It took place on 22 April at the Autodromo Enzo e Dino Ferrari.

Johan Kristoffersson won both races, driving an Audi RS5.

Classification

Qualifying

Race 1

Race 2

Standings after the event

International Series and Italian Championship standings

Teams' Championship standings

 Note: Only the top five positions are included for both sets of drivers' standings.

References

2012 in Italian motorsport
Superstars Series seasons